Pothoideae is a subfamily of flowering plants in the family Araceae. The species in the subfamily are true aroids.

Tribes and genera
The subfamily consists of two tribes:
Anthurieae
 Anthurium Schott

Pothoeae
 Pothos L.
 Pedicellarum M.Hotta (monotypic)
 Pothoidium Schott (monotypic)

References

 Mayo, S.J., Bogner, J., and Boyce, J.C. (1998) The genera of Araceae project, Acta Botanica Yunnanica.
 Bown, Deni (2000). Aroids: Plants of the Arum Family [ILLUSTRATED]. Timber Press. 

 
Alismatales subfamilies